The Arriflex 16BL is ARRI's first silent 16mm production motion picture camera, released in 1965.

Function
The functionality is similar to the Arriflex 16M. It is built around the spinning reflex twin-bladed "butterfly" mirror shutter, set at 45 degrees horizontally to the lens axis. It is self blimped and measures 31 dB while running, in 3 ft distance from the camera.

The 16BL introduced the ARRI Bayonet lens mount, which was also used in later cameras. This stainless steel mount is much stronger than the aluminium Arri standard mount. The viewfinder is located on the gate door.

The Arriflex 16ST can load 1200 ft and 400 ft external magazines, which can be attached to the top. The camera is driven by a 12V crystal control motor, which can be controlled on the right side. It can record between 8 and 48 fps.

The standard matte box is adjustable in length to fit the different focal lengths of the lenses.

Trivia
During the development this camera model was called Arriflex 16Q, for "quiet". The name was changed to Arriflex 16BL, for "blimped".

The Arriflex 16BL is still popular among independent filmmakers today, since it is one of the cheapest silent 16mm cameras.

References

External links
 Instruction Manual
 Product Brochure
 History of ARRI 
 List of movies shot on the 16BL

Movie cameras